This is a list of cities in Equatorial Guinea, arranged by population.  It includes all settlements with a population over 1,000.

List

Other towns and villages
Acalayong
Bolondo
Moca
Oyala, the future national capital, currently under construction
San Antonio de Palé

References

External links

 
Equatorial Guinea, List of cities in
Equatorial Guinea
Cities